Saxon Winston Holt (March 25, 1871 – March 31, 1940), a Democrat, served as a member of the Virginia Senate and as the 24th Lieutenant Governor of Virginia from 1938 until 1940.

Holt, from Newport News, Virginia, held office from January 19, 1938, until his death on March 31, 1940. His unexpired term went unfilled.

Electoral history

References

External links
 

Politicians from Newport News, Virginia
1871 births
1940 deaths
Lieutenant Governors of Virginia
Virginia Democrats
20th-century American politicians